Maryada...of an Indian family is a Hindi TV serial that aired on TV Asia from 2007 until 2009, based on the story of a 19-year-old girl Meenakshi, who is a real life example of tradition in which she tries to change herself to save relationships with her dad's family.

Plot

One day Surendra migrates to London to get away from his brother Veerpratap's mockings, while his wife stays in India. There he meets a woman whom he starts liking; they get married. Time goes by and Surendra's first wife, who stays in India, delivers a son named Vikram. The wife in London delivers a daughter named Meenakshi.
 
Unfortunately, one day Surendra and his wife dies in an accident in London. Their last wish is to get their ashes immersed in India. To fulfill their wish, Meenakshi comes to India with her parents' ashes. There she goes to her dad's family's house as he had told her to. The family does not accept her, especially Veerpratap Singh, and they want her to go back as soon as possible. Meenakshi stays in the house to convince everyone in the family to perform the last rituals for her parents. Leisurely, she convinces her uncles Veerpratap and Rajvir to perform the ritual. But Rajvir and Veerpratap are shocked when Meenakshi expresses her desire that her mother should get her due respect in this house. In spite of all that, she makes it happen. In the bargain Meenaskhi causes clashes at home.

Meenakshi gradually makes a good impression. But life is not smooth sailing. Luck turns when her boyfriend, whom she met in London, happens to come in the same house as Krishna. Krishna is Veerpratap's son; Krishna is Meenakshi's cousin brother. Time to unwind, rethink, and sacrifice. But time uncovers that Krishna was adopted — they are not biological brother and sister. Now Meenakshi has to compromise her love and start a new life.

Meenasksi cannot stop loving Krishna, and Krishna loves Meenakshi. Now uncle fixed Meenashi's wedding with a guy in outside family. The question remains that how Meenakshi finds her love? How will she keep her tradition alive?

Cast
 Jyoti Makker ... Neelakshi
 Vineet Raina / Akshat Gupta ... Krishna (Krish)
Asha Sharma ... Maa Saheba
 Kiran Kumar ... Veerpratap Singh
Saheba Khan ... Padma  
 Surendra Pal ... Rajvir Singh
 Shashi Sharma ... Roopvati
 Afzaal Khan ... Vikram
Monika Kale ... Rimzim
 Mukesh Khanna ... Vishal
 S. M. Zaheer ... Rana Sahab
 Jayshree T. ... Sandhya
 Jaya Binju ... Kali (worker in the office)
Meena Sharma ... Raziyappa
Nitin Keswani ... Vinith
Tej Sapru ... Vijay
Rachana Mutreja ... Laxmi
Shruti Bhattacharya ... Urmi (House-maid)
 Kapil Soni ... Nikhil
Jayashree ... Sony

External links
Official Site

2007 Indian television series debuts
2009 Indian television series endings
Indian television soap operas